Zambezi is an advertising and marketing agency in Culver City, California. Founded in 2006 in Venice Beach by former Wieden & Kennedy executives, the agency originally specialized in sports marketing. After buying out its principal owner, the agency’s management team shifted its focus to communications for consumer brands, beyond sports and entertainment. They also moved their headquarters to Culver City.

Recognition
Zambezi was named to Inc. magazine's list of 500/500 Fastest Growing Private Companies in 2011, 2012 and 2013 and recognized as an Advertising Age Small Agency of the Year in 2011 and 2016. 

Zambezi also made the list of 100 Largest Woman-Owned Business in Los Angeles County by the Los Angeles Business Journal in 2016 and 2015. 

In 2016, the agency’s campaign for Stance, “Shop With the Force”, won a One Show Gold Pencil, an Advertising Age Digital Campaign of the Year Silver Award and a Gold Lion at the Cannes International Festival of Advertising.

Campaigns
The agency has produced campaigns for Autotrader, The Venetian, TaylorMade, Stance, SmartWater, and Popchips.

References

External links
Zambezi Official Site
Social Media Marketing
GetFollowerUp Homepage

Marketing companies established in 2006
Advertising agencies of the United States
Companies based in Culver City, California